Bill Baggs Cape Florida State Recreation Area occupies approximately the southern third of the island of Key Biscayne, at coordinates . This park includes the Cape Florida Light, the oldest standing structure in Greater Miami. In 2005, it was ranked as having the 8th best beach in the country, and in 2013 Forbes ranked it at 7th.

The park was named in honor of Bill Baggs, editor of The Miami News from 1957 until his death in 1969. He worked to protect the land from development and to preserve some of the key in its natural state.

In 2004 a large historical marker was erected at the site to mark it as part of the National Underground Railroad Network to Freedom Trail, as hundreds of Black Seminoles, many fugitive slaves, escaped from here to freedom in the Bahamas, settling mostly on Andros Island. In the early 1820s, some 300 American slaves reached the Bahamas, aboard 27 sloops and many canoes. The US National Park Service is working with the Bahamas, particularly the African Bahamanian Museum and Research Center (ABAC) in Nassau, to develop interpretive programs at Red Bays, Andros.

Recreational activities
The park has more than a mile of sandy Atlantic beachfront, where snorkeling and swimming is possible. Besides the beach and tours of the lighthouse and keeper's quarters, activities include boating, canoeing, kayaking and fishing from the seawall along Biscayne Bay, bicycling, hiking and wildlife viewing. The park has such amenities as picnicking areas and youth camping. It also has a visitor center, a museum with interpretive exhibits and concessions. No Name Harbor, a natural harbor in the park, is used for anchorage.

Hours
Florida state parks are open between 8 a.m. and sundown every day of the year (including holidays).

Gallery

References

Further reading
Rosalyn A. Howard, Black Seminoles in the Bahamas, Gainesville: University of Florida, 2002

External links

Bill Baggs Cape Florida State Park - official site
 Bill Baggs Cape Florida State Park at Florida State Parks
 Bill Baggs Cape Florida State Recreation Area at Absolutely Florida
 Bill Baggs Cape Florida State Park at South Florida Sun-Sentinel
 Cape Florida and the Bill Baggs State Recreation Area at key-biscayne.com

Key Biscayne, Florida
Beaches of Miami-Dade County, Florida
Bill Baggs Cape Florida
Parks in Miami-Dade County, Florida
Maritime museums in Florida
Museums in Miami-Dade County, Florida
Protected areas established in 1967
1967 establishments in Florida
Beaches of Florida